Thomas Edward "Toddy" Pierse (21 July 1898 – 11 October 1968) was an Irish Gaelic footballer. His championship career at senior level with the Wexford and Dublin county teams spanned seven seasons from 1918 until 1924.

Pierse first played competitive football on the inter-county scene as a member of the Wexford senior team in 1918. He won an All-Ireland medal that year as Wexford won a record fourth successive championship. In 1921 Pierse joined the Dublin senior team and went on to win back-to-back All-Ireland medals in 1921 and 1922. He also won three Leinster medals. Pierse ended his career back with the Wexford team in 1924.

Honours
University College Dublin
Sigerson Cup (2): 1920 (c), 1924

Wexford
All-Ireland Senior Football Championship (1): 1918
Leinster Senior Football Championship (1): 1918

Dublin
All-Ireland Senior Football Championship (2): 1921, 1922
Leinster Senior Football Championship (2): 1921, 1922

References

1898 births
1968 deaths
Dublin inter-county Gaelic footballers
Gaelic football forwards
20th-century Irish medical doctors
UCD Gaelic footballers
Wexford inter-county Gaelic footballers